"At the Codfish Ball" is the seventh episode of the fifth season of the American television drama series Mad Men and the 59th episode of the series overall. 

The episode is named after the 1936 popular novelty song of the same name by Lew Pollack and Sidney Mitchell.  The song recorded by artists of the era including Mae Questel, Bob Crosby, and Tommy Dorsey, as well as decades later by Maria Muldaur. It was featured in a song and dance routine performed by Shirley Temple in the 1936 film Captain January.

The episode was written by Jonathan Igla and directed by Michael Uppendahl. It originally aired on the AMC channel in the United States on April 29, 2012. This episode takes place from late September to early October 1966.

In the episode, Megan comes up with a last-minute pitch to save the Heinz account. Peggy thinks Abe is going to propose to her, but he instead suggests they move in together, a decision that does not go over well with her mother. The extended Draper family convenes to attend a banquet in which Don is honored by the American Cancer Society. At the banquet, Sally is exposed to the world of adults.

"At the Codfish Ball" was watched by 2.31 million viewers, a decline from the previous episode. It pulled in 700,000 viewers in the 18-49 demographic. Nevertheless, the episode was well received by television critics.

Plot
Sally Draper (Kiernan Shipka) calls Glen Bishop (Marten Weiner) to complain about Pauline Francis (Pamela Dunlap), who is babysitting her and Bobby while the rest of the family is on vacation, calling her step-grandmother "Bluto" and saying she smells like a toilet. Pauline trips on the telephone cord outside the door and falls.

Don (Jon Hamm) hauls Megan's parents' luggage into the apartment. Her father Emile (Ronald Guttman) and mother Marie (Julia Ormond), visiting from Montreal, argue in French. Megan (Jessica Paré) asks them to speak English. Don takes a phone call from Sally about Pauline's accident. Later, during dinner while Don is absent, Emile criticizes Don and Megan takes offense. Don arrives with the kids, saying that Pauline broke her ankle. Sally says that Pauline tripped over a toy, and Don praises his daughter for how she handled the situation. Marie excuses herself from dinner. Megan goes to check on her and, finding her mother asleep with a burning cigarette still in hand, sadly takes the flammable object away and leaves her alone to slumber.

Roger (John Slattery) and his ex-wife Mona (Talia Balsam) meet, and he tells her about how his recent LSD experience has changed his life. He requests her assistance arranging meetings with prospective clients he will be meeting at an upcoming American Cancer Society dinner to honor Don for his published anti-smoking letter. She knows about his forthcoming divorce and is amused by it, but implies she will help him out with business anyway.

The next day, Megan approaches Don with an idea for the Heinz campaign: a mother serving her child beans in various historical contexts, from caveman times through to the future. They discuss different tag lines, and an excited Don tells Stan Rizzo (Jay R. Ferguson) and Michael Ginsberg (Ben Feldman) about the idea. Abe Drexler (Charlie Hofheimer) calls Peggy (Elisabeth Moss) and insists on meeting her for dinner. Stan and Ginsberg complain about the last-minute Heinz change but Stan admits it's better than anything they'd come up with before.

Peggy tells Joan (Christina Hendricks) she thinks Abe is going to break up with her over dinner, but Joan tells her that perhaps he is going to propose to her, telling her that if he breaks up with her she already knows her response, but if he is going to propose, that she needs to have her answer prepared, especially if it is no. Peggy arrives for dinner with Abe in a new dress, who doesn't ask if she will marry him but rather if she would like to move in together. She hesitates but says "I do".

At a dinner with Heinz, Megan learns the Heinz client, Raymond Geiger (John Sloman), is planning to fire the agency. She secretly tells this to Don and prompts him to pitch the new concept at the table. Raymond is impressed and finally gives the plan a thumbs-up. Later in a cab, Don lavishes his wife with praise and kisses. Since their apartment is currently crowded, she suggests they have sex at the office.

The next morning, Peggy tells Joan that she and Abe are moving in together, worried that Joan will be disappointed for her. Joan calls it a romantic notion and suggests marriage may be overrated, noting that Greg had decided his commitment to the U.S. Army is more important than his commitment to her. Ken Cosgrove (Aaron Staton) recounts the Heinz meeting to everyone in the conference room, but Harry Crane takes credit he doesn't deserve, while Pete Campbell notes they still are out of thousands of dollars spent wooing Heinz. Don credits his wife, who calls it beginner's luck. Peggy congratulates Megan, telling her "This is as good as this job gets." Megan looks melancholic, not being enthusiastic about it as she is being told she should be.

The next day, Sally asks her father if she can go to the awards dinner. Emile and Marie quarrel again, and Megan lets Don know that her father is cheating on her mother.

That evening, Roger arrives and Marie helps him with his bow tie. Sally shows off her dress. Don tells his daughter to remove her makeup and go-go boots before they leave, with Emile making a comment about daughters growing up.  Later in the award room Don affectionately tells her that she is a beautiful girl who will one day wear makeup but not tonight.

Peggy and Abe prepare dinner at her apartment. Her mother Katherine (Myra Turley) arrives, and Peggy tells her that she and Abe are moving in together. Katherine opposes the idea and says she would rather Peggy just lie about it. She tells Peggy that Abe is just using her as practice before he decides to marry and have a family with another woman in the future, and snidely advises her to just "get a cat" if she's lonely.

At the ACS dinner, Pete Campbell (Vincent Kartheiser) introduces Don and Megan to Ed Baxter (Ray Wise), Ken’s father-in-law. Ed compliments Don's talent and Megan's contribution to the Heinz campaign. Roger shows a genuine side when he spends the night with Sally on his arm, telling her about the event's attendees; Marie watches him from across the room. Later at the bar, Marie approaches Roger. Meanwhile, Emile tells Megan she has changed, that her marriage to Don has ultimately allowed her to take a shortcut in life instead of working for it, reminding her of her acting dreams she was once so driven about. She rebuffs him but is visibly bothered by this truth. Sally later enters a room down the hall and sees Marie fellating Roger. Back in the showroom, Ed tells Don the companies at the event love his talent and will shower him with awards but, because of the letter he wrote against Lucky Strike, will never hire him. Don looks stunned. As he returns to the table and rejoins Megan, her parents, and Sally, they each look crestfallen.

Back at Don’s apartment while everyone is sleeping, Sally sneaks out in her pajamas and calls Glen. He asks her how the city was and she replies that it's “dirty”.

Reception

Ratings
"At the Codfish Ball" was viewed by 2.31 million viewers on the night of its original airing. It drew 700,000 viewers in the 18-49 demographic.

Critical reception
The episode received high praise from television critics. Alan Sepinwall of HitFix called the Draper Heinz pitch "a glorious moment", adding "the best Don Draper pitch in ages. It is also, unfortunately, the last moment in this terrific episode where the rug is pulled out from under someone and they respond remotely that well ... [the episode's] proper conclusion is that beautiful shot of Megan's parents, Megan, Don and Sally sitting around that fancy table, some combination of disappointment, pain, betrayal and disgust washing over all their faces." The Hollywood Reporter Tim Goodman stated: "There were a series of gears seamlessly interlocking in 'At the Codfish Ball,' an episode of Mad Men that very creatively dissected the way men talk to and interact with women and women talk to and interact with each other. It was a nuanced play on generations that also—separately—was funny, sexy and had a very intriguing idea dropped so casually into the mix [that companies don't want to work with Don] it could easily have gone unnoticed." Emily VanderWerff of The A.V. Club gave the episode an A− grade, adding "'At the Codfish Ball' is an episode brimming with scenes between parents and children—both real and imagined. If the fifth season of Mad Men has dealt with generational divides in a more abstract sense—the 'youth' movement versus the old guard—then 'At the Codfish Ball' dealt with this on a hyper-personal level." Time magazine writer Nate Rawlings liked the episode's three solid plot lines for Peggy, Megan and Sally. About the latter two, he stated: "For the first 50 minutes of [the] episode, I thought this would be the chapter where Megan really came into her own. She ... out-Draper's Draper when the chips are on the table. She seems born for the job (and she’s even really sweet when Don's kids show up unexpectedly). But she’s also painfully aware that her parents aren't happy, either with each other or her chosen profession. Yet as bad as things seem for ... Megan, Sally's venture into the adult world could charitably be called a disappointment (traumatic experience is more like it)."

Awards
"At the Codfish Ball" was nominated for the Primetime Emmy Award for Outstanding Art Direction for a Single-Camera Series.

References

External links
"At the Codfish Ball" at AMC

2012 American television episodes
Mad Men (season 5) episodes
Television episodes directed by Michael Uppendahl